The Argentina is an Italian river in the province of Imperia.

Geography 

Its source is near the French border. The river flows past Triora and flows south before emptying into the Ligurian Sea, near Arma di Taggia.

See also
 List of rivers of Italy

References

Rivers of Italy
Rivers of Liguria
Rivers of the Province of Imperia
Rivers of the Alps
Drainage basins of the Ligurian Sea